Stara Vas may refer to several places in Slovenia:

Dolenja Stara Vas, a settlement in the Municipality of Šentjernej, southeastern Slovenia
Dolnja Stara Vas, a settlement in the Municipality of Škocjan, southeastern Slovenia
Gorenja Stara Vas, a former settlement in the Municipality of Šentjernej, southeastern Slovenia
Gornja Stara Vas, a settlement in the Municipality of Škocjan, southeastern Slovenia
Mala Stara Vas, a settlement in the Municipality of Grosuplje, central Slovenia
Stara Nova Vas, a settlement in the Municipality of Križevci, northeastern Slovenia
Stara Vas–Bizeljsko, a settlement in the Municipality of Municipality of Brežice, eastern Slovenia
Stara Vas, Krško, a former settlement in the Municipality of Krško, eastern Slovenia
Stara Vas, Postojna, a settlement in the Municipality of Postojna, southwestern Slovenia
Stara Vas, Žiri, a former settlement in the Municipality of Žiri, western Slovenia
Velika Stara Vas, a settlement in the Municipality of Grosuplje, central Slovenia